The athletics events at the 1955 Summer International University Sports Week were held in San Sebastián, Spain, between 11 and 14 August.

Medal summary

Men

Women

Medal table

References
World Student Games (Pre-Universiade) - GBR Athletics

Athletics at the Summer Universiade
1955 Summer International University Sports Week
Uni